The 2008 Rabo Ster Zeeuwsche Eilanden was the 11th edition of the Ster Zeeuwsche Eilanden, a women's cycling stage race in the Netherlands. It was rated by the UCI as a category 2.2 race and was held between 19 and 21 June 2008.

Stages

Stage 1
19 June 2008 – Vlissingen to Vlissingen,  (Individual time trial)

Stage 2
20 June 2008 – Middelburg to Vlissingen,

Stage 3
21 June 2008 – Kamperland to Renesse,

Final classifications

General classification

Source

Points classification

Source

Youth classification

Source

Sprints classification

Source

Classification leadership

See also
 2008 in women's road cycling

References

External links
 

2008 in women's road cycling
Ster Zeeuwsche Eilanden
2008 in Dutch sport